Novyye Ishly (Yañı İşle) is a rural locality (a selo) in Kacheganovsky Selsoviet, Miyakinsky District, Bashkortostan, Russia. The population was 467 as of 2010. There are 8 streets.

Geography 
Novyye Ishly is located 18 km south of Kirgiz-Miyaki (the district's administrative centre) by road. Kacheganovo is the nearest rural locality.

References 

Rural localities in Miyakinsky District